The 1954 Middle Tennessee Blue Raiders football team represented the Middle Tennessee State College—now known as Middle Tennessee State University—as a member of the Ohio Valley Conference (OVC) during the 1954 college football season. Led by eighth-year head coach Charles M. Murphy, the Blue Raiders compiled a record an overall record of 4–4–2 with a mark of 2–2–1 in conference play, placing fourth in the OVC. The team's captains were Joe Collier and Garner Eze.

Schedule

References

Middle Tennessee
Middle Tennessee Blue Raiders football seasons
Middle Tennessee Blue Raiders football